"Sleepyhead" is the debut single from American electronic band Passion Pit, featured on their first EP, Chunk of Change, and later on their debut album Manners. The single was released in September 2008. The song contains samples of "Óró Mo Bháidín" by Mary O'Hara and "San Francisco Scene (The Beat Generation)" by Jack Kerouac ("and everything is going to the beat").  An instrumental version of the song also makes an appearance in the video game LittleBigPlanet 2.

Track listing
 7" Single
 "Sleepyhead" – 2:55
 "Better Things" – 4:32

 Grum & Little Vampires Club Mixes
 "Sleepyhead (Grum Remix)" – 7:26
 "Sleepyhead (Grum Dub)" – 7:26
 "Sleepyhead (Grum Radio Edit)" – 3:57
 "Sleepyhead (Little Vampires Remix)" – 3:56

 Wawa Club Mixes
 "Sleepyhead (Wawa Remix)" – 6:08
 "Sleepyhead (Wawa Dub)" – 6:02
 "Sleepyhead (Wawa Radio Edit)" – 3:03

Charts

Certifications

References
 
 https://www.discogs.com/Passion-Pit-Sleepyhead-Grum-Little-Vampires-Club-Mixes/release/4969997
 https://www.discogs.com/Passion-Pit-Sleepyhead-Wawa-Club-Mixes/release/4969965

External links
 Official band website
 Official video

2008 singles
Passion Pit songs
2008 songs
Songs written by Michael Angelakos
Columbia Records singles
Frenchkiss Records singles